Atefeh Ahmadi (born 23 December 2000)   is an alpine skier from Iran. She is a silver medalist in the Super-G event of the 2018 Asian Alpine Ski Championships.

Her father was a member of the Iranian national cross-country skiing team. He also became the first coach for Atefa and her sister Hadis.

She has been performing at the adult level since 2017; the next season, she won her first gold in the National Championship, held in Darbandsar. In the giant slalom competition, Ahmadi defeated her more experienced rivals   Forough Abbasi and Marjan Kalhor.

She qualified for the 2022 Winter Olympics. She competed at the 2022 Winter Olympics in Beijing. She was the only woman from Iran to take part and was Iran's flag bearer. In January 2023, she applied for asylum in Germany. Officially, she had travelled to Europe to prepare for the World Championships in France in February.

References

External links
 
 Atefeh Ahmadi at the Eurosport
 Atefeh Ahmadi at The-Sports.org

2000 births
Living people
Iranian female alpine skiers
21st-century Iranian women
Alpine skiers at the 2022 Winter Olympics
Olympic alpine skiers of Iran